At least two ships of the Royal Navy have borne the name HMS Blackfly:

 , a  built in 1916. She sank after colliding with a bridge in Baghdad on 16 May 1923 while loaned to the Air Ministry.
 , an anti-submarine trawler, requisitioned in 1939. She was sold in July 1946.

Royal Navy ship names